Baho is a commune in the Pyrénées-Orientales department in southern France.

Geography 

Baho is located in the canton of Le Ribéral and in the arrondissement of Perpignan.

Government and politics

Mayors

Population 
The inhabitants are called Bahotencs.

Sites of interest 
Baho is the site of an ancient fort. In the 10th century, Baho was a possession of the abbey of Saint-Michel-de-Cuxa (Pyrénées-Orientales)

See also
Communes of the Pyrénées-Orientales department

References

External links

 Official site

Communes of Pyrénées-Orientales